Timothy Max Adleman (born November 13, 1987) is an American professional baseball pitcher who is currently a free agent. He has played in Major League Baseball (MLB) for the Cincinnati Reds and the Samsung Lions of the KBO League.

Career

Baltimore Orioles
Adleman played college baseball at Georgetown University. He was drafted by the Baltimore Orioles in the 24th round of the 2010 Major League Baseball Draft. He made his professional debut for the Low-A Aberdeen IronBirds. In 2011, Adleman played for the Single-A Delmarva Shorebirds, pitching to a 5–7 record and 6.01 ERA with 72 strikeouts in 28 games. On March 27, 2012, Adleman was released by the Orioles organization.

Lincoln Saltdogs
After his release, Adleman signed with the Lincoln Saltdogs of the American Association of Independent Professional Baseball. He appeared in 5 games for Lincoln, allowing 3 runs in 7.0 innings of work.

El Paso Diablos
On June 18, 2012, Adleman was traded to the El Paso Diablos, also of the American Association. In 29 games for El Paso, Adleman registered a 5.94 ERA with 30 strikeouts.

New Jersey Jackals
In 2013, Adleman signed with the New Jersey Jackals of the Canadian-American Association of Professional Baseball. Adleman pitched to a 1.46 ERA in 40 games for the Jackals, also notching 62 strikeouts.

Cincinnati Reds
On October 14, 2013, Adleman signed a minor league contract with the Cincinnati Reds organization. In 2014, Adleman split the year between the Single-A Bakersfield Blaze and Double-A Pensacola Blue Wahoos, registering a cumulative 3–9 record and 3.72 ERA in 38 games. In 2015, he spent the season in Double-A with Pensacola, pitching to a 9–10 record and 2.64 ERA with 113.0 strikeouts in 150.0 innings of work. Adleman was assigned to the Triple-A Louisville Bats to begin the 2016 season.

After recording a 2.38 ERA in 10 Triple-A games, Adleman was called up to make his major league debut on May 1, 2016. He pitched 6 plus innings with 6 SOs and allowing only 3 hits and 2 runs against the Pittsburgh Pirates. On the year, Adleman registered a 4.00 ERA in 13 games. In 2017, Adleman spent the entire season in the majors, aside from 1 game in Louisville, pitching to a 5–11 record and 5.52 ERA in 30 appearances. On November 30, 2017, Adleman was released by the Reds to pursue an opportunity in Korea.

Samsung Lions
On November 30, 2017, Adleman signed a one-year, $1.05 million contract with the Samsung Lions of the KBO League. In 2018 for Samsung, Adleman pitched to an 8–12 record and 5.05 ERA across 31 appearances. He became a free agent after the season.

Cincinnati Reds (second stint)
On January 23, 2019, Adleman signed a minor league deal with the Cincinnati Reds organization that included an invitation to major league spring training. He was released by the Reds on March 22, 2019.

Long Island Ducks
On April 11, 2019, Adleman signed with the Long Island Ducks of the Atlantic League of Professional Baseball. Adleman recorded a 1.64 ERA in 3 appearances for the Ducks.

Detroit Tigers
On May 11, 2019, Adleman's contract was purchased by the Detroit Tigers and he was assigned to the Triple-A Toledo Mud Hens. Adleman pitched to a 9–4 record with a 3.32 ERA, which would have been best in the International League had he qualified for the pitching statistic leaderboard. He struck out 119 batters and finished the season with a 1.15 WHIP. He became a minor league free agent on November 7, 2019, before he was quickly resigned on November 5. He was invited to Spring Training for the 2020 season. Adleman did not play in a game in 2020 due to the cancellation of the Minor League Baseball season because of the COVID-19 pandemic. He became a free agent on November 2, 2020.

Cincinnati Reds (third stint)
On April 30, 2021, Adleman signed a minor league contract with the Cincinnati Reds organization.

New York Mets
On March 16, 2022, Adleman signed a minor league contract with the New York Mets. He was released on August 10, 2022.

References

External links

KBO Stats

1987 births
Living people
Aberdeen IronBirds players
American expatriate baseball players in South Korea
Bakersfield Blaze players
Cincinnati Reds players
Delmarva Shorebirds players
El Paso Diablos players
Erie SeaWolves players
Estrellas Orientales players
American expatriate baseball players in the Dominican Republic
Georgetown Hoyas baseball players
KBO League pitchers
Lincoln Saltdogs players
Long Island Ducks players
Louisville Bats players
Major League Baseball pitchers
New Jersey Jackals players
Pensacola Blue Wahoos players
Sportspeople from Staten Island
Baseball players from New York City
Toledo Mud Hens players